'Sneha Club' was established in 2001 by Siva Bhagya Rao with motive of serving the backward caste section of the society in rural areas. This club has succeeded in inspiring over 12,000 members to establish 224 clubs and conduct 20 service activities per month focusing on education and healthcare. Owing to this, Westbrook University conferred upon Mr. Rao the honorary degree of the Doctor of Philosophy (Ph.D.) for his contribution to the field of Educational Administration in India on 1 October 2008.

Sneha Club provided vocational training to over 900 people and helped them secure employment, distributed books to more than 800,000 students through mobile libraries.

References

Organisations based in Hyderabad, India
2001 establishments in Andhra Pradesh
Organizations established in 2001